Edvarda is a given name which is in use in Scandinavia. It is the feminine derivative of Edvard.

Given name
 Edvarda Lie (1910–1983), Norwegian painter

Fictional characters
 Edvarda, main character in Knut Hamsun’s novel Pan (1894)

References

Scandinavian feminine given names